Micheline Joubert (born 18 June 1945, in Paris) is a French former figure skater who competed in single skating and pair skating. As a pairs skater, she won the gold medal at the French Figure Skating Championships four times, with Philippe Pélissier from 1960 to 1962, and with Alain Trouillet in 1964. As a single skater, she finished second at the French championships four times and finished 20th at the 1968 Winter Olympics

Micheline is no relation to fellow French skater Brian Joubert.

Results

Ladies' singles

Pairs with Pélissier

Pairs with Trouillet

External links
 

1945 births
French female single skaters
French female pair skaters
Figure skaters at the 1968 Winter Olympics
Olympic figure skaters of France
Figure skaters from Paris
Olympic medalists in figure skating
Living people
20th-century French women
21st-century French women